Noorama is a rural locality in the Shire of Paroo, Queensland, Australia. It in on the border of Queensland and New South Wales.

Geography 
The locality is bounded to the south by the border of Queensland and New South Wales. Noorama Creek and Widgeegoara Creek flow from the north of the locality (Widgeegoara) through to the south of the locality (Enngonia, New South Wales). These creeks are distributaries of the Warrego River.

Jobs Gate Road traverses the locality from Jobs Gate in the east through to Widgeegoara in the north.

The predominant land use is grazing of cattle and sheep.

History 
Pastoralists moved into the Noorama district from the 1860s to the 1880s. The locality presumably takes its name from the Noorama pastoral station which was established in 1879 by the North British Australian Company.

In 1950s a number of recreational groups were established, including a cricket club, a tennis club and an annual gymkhana was held.

The Noorama Picnic Race Club was established in 1964, holding its first race meeting on 14 May 1966.

Amenities 
Noorama racecourse is on Jobs Creek Road.

Education 
There are no schools in Noorama. Distance education and boarding schools are the alternatives.

Events 
The annual Noorama Picnic Races held in April attracts both local people and tourists.

References 

Shire of Paroo
Localities in Queensland